Sir Panapakkam Anandacharlu CIE (5 August 1843 – 4 January 1908) was an Indian advocate, freedom fighter and one of the early doyens of the Indian National Congress. He was the President of the Nagpur session of the Indian National Congress held in 1891.

Early life 
Anandacharlu was born in the village of Kattamanchi in Chittoor district, Madras Presidency in a Brahmin family. He moved to Madras city at an early age and became an apprentice to a leading Madras advocate called Kayali Venkatapathi. His practise as a full lawyer began in 1869 when he became a member of the Chamber of the Madras High Court.

Legal career 
Anandacharlu became a member of the Chamber of the High Court of Madras in the year 1869. Soon he emerged as a prominent advocate and was appointed Leader of the Bar. It was in his Chambers that the Madras Advocates' Association was born in 1899.

By way of information, Anandacharlu was made a Rai Bahadur and was awarded the CIE (Companion of the Indian Empire) in 1897. He was not knighted (i.e. given the title of KBE—Knight of the British Empire) hence he can't be referred to as Sir Panampakkam.

Political Career 
From the very beginning, Anandacharlu was interested in politics and journalism. He contributed regularly to magazines as Native Public Opinion and the Madrasi. In 1878, he helped G. Subrahmania Iyer and C. Viraraghavachariar in starting The Hindu and became a frequent contributor to it.

He founded the Triplicane Literary Society (of which he was elected president) and the Madras Mahajana Sabha in 1884. He was one of the 72 delegates at the first session of the Indian National Congress held at Bombay in 1885. He also participated in the Nagpur session of the Indian National Congress in 1891 of which he was elected president. When the Congress split in 1906, he was on the side of the moderates. However, he died soon after the split.

References 

Telugu people
1843 births
1908 deaths
Companions of the Order of the Indian Empire
Place of death missing
Presidents of the Indian National Congress